Naqaash Sarosh Tahir (born 14 November 1983) is an English cricketer. He is a right-arm fast-medium bowler who has played for Lancashire and Warwickshire. He made his first-class debut for Warwickshire in 2004.

After a promising start to his career, his progress was hindered by injuries over the next few years leaving him out of the first team for extended periods. He was approached by Worcestershire to join them after the 2009 season but instead, following a return to form and an extended run in the first team, was offered and accepted a new two-year contract with Warwickshire with the option of a third year subject to fitness. Warwickshire released Tahir after the end of the 2011 season. Derbyshire offered him a contract but Tahir chose to sign a one-year contract with Lancashire who won the County Championship in 2011.

References

1983 births
English cricketers
Living people
Warwickshire cricketers
English people of Pakistani descent
Lancashire cricketers
British sportspeople of Pakistani descent